Nkana is part of the Zambian city of Kitwe. Nkana might also refer to:

Nkana (constituency), Zambian political constituency
Nkana F.C., Zambian football club
Nkana Stadium, Zambian football stadium